Hicham Bouaouiche (born 16 June 1974) is a retired Moroccan long-distance runner who specialized in the 3000 metres steeplechase.

He finished eleventh at the 1996 Summer Olympics, fifth at the 1997 World Championships in Athletics, and eleventh in the Grand Prix Final the same year. His personal best time is 8:10.10 minutes, achieved in July 1998 in Nice.
 
At the 1998 IAAF World Cross Country Championships in Marrakech Bouaouiche finished ninth in the short race and won a silver medal with the Moroccan team. He was the silver medallist in the steeplechase at the 1997 Mediterranean Games.

References

External links

1974 births
Living people
Moroccan male long-distance runners
Athletes (track and field) at the 1996 Summer Olympics
Olympic athletes of Morocco
Moroccan male steeplechase runners
Mediterranean Games silver medalists for Morocco
Mediterranean Games medalists in athletics
Athletes (track and field) at the 1997 Mediterranean Games
20th-century Moroccan people
21st-century Moroccan people